Jim Montgomery may refer to:

 Jim Montgomery (basketball) (1915–1982), American basketball player
 Jim Montgomery (ice hockey) (born 1969), Canadian ice hockey player and coach
 Jim Montgomery (swimmer) (born 1955), American Olympic swimmer and gold medalist
 Jim Montgomery (American football) (1922–1992), American football player
 Jimmy Montgomery (born 1943), English retired football (soccer) goalkeeper

See also
James Montgomery (disambiguation)